Aclytia albistriga is a moth of the family Erebidae. It was described by Schaus in 1910. It is found in Costa Rica.

References

Moths described in 1910
Aclytia
Moths of Central America